The Common Minimum Programme is a document outlining the minimum objectives of a coalition government in India. The document has acquired prominence since coalition governments have become the norm in India.

The common minimum programme of Congress-led UPA coalition which won the 2004 Indian general election, had a heavy emphasis on tackling the needs of India's poor.
Six basic principles for governance by UPA were:
To preserve, protect and promote social harmony and to enforce the law without fear or favour to deal with all obscurantist and fundamentalist elements who seek to disturb social amity and peace.
To ensure that the economy grows at least 7-8% per year in a sustained manner over a decade and more and in a manner that generates employment so that each family is assured of a safe and viable livelihood.
To enhance the welfare and well-being of farmers, farm labour and workers, particularly those in the unorganised sector, and assure a secure future for their families in every respect.
To fully empower women politically, educationally, economically and legally.
To provide for full equality of opportunity, particularly in education and employment for the Scheduled Castes, Scheduled Tribes, OBCs and religious minorities.
To unleash the creative energies of our entrepreneurs, businessmen, scientists, engineers and all other professionals and productive forces of society.
The UPA makes a solemn pledge to the people of our country: to provide a government that is corruption-free, transparent and accountable at all times, to provide an administration that is responsible and responsive at all times, and all people are equal – there is no discrimination on any caste.

See also
Five-Year plans of India

References

External links
1. National Common Minimum Programme of the Government of India, May 2004 

2.

Politics of India
Coalition governments of India